Cunningham is an unincorporated community in Montgomery County, Tennessee, United States. It is located approximately 9.5 miles south of downtown Clarksville, at the intersection of State Route 13 and State Route 48. Cunningham has a post office, with ZIP code 37052.

Cunningham is the location of Montgomery Central High, Middle, and Elementary Schools, as well as a volunteer fire department, several businesses, along with numerous homes and farms.

Notes

Unincorporated communities in Montgomery County, Tennessee
Unincorporated communities in Tennessee